Walter Kreye (born 18 July 1942 in Oldenburg) is a German actor.

Biography
Kreye is the son of radio editor and writer Walter A. Kreye. He graduated from Bochum Drama School and then had theater engagements at the Hamburg Schauspielhaus, the Thalia Theater, and the Stuttgart State Theater.

From 1980, he appeared in the television series Ein Fall für zwei, Praxis Bülowbogen, Der Fahnder, and Tatort. In 1990, he won the silver Grimme-Preis for his performance in Reporter.
In 2007, he succeeded Rolf Schimpf in the crime series The Old Fox as chief inspector Rolf Herzog.
In 2017, Kreye appeared in the Netflix series Dark as Tronte Nielsen.

Kreye is married to actress Sabine Wegner and has two daughters and a son from his first marriage.
In 2011, he was diagnosed with colon cancer, which caused him to stop performing until after his recovery.

Selected filmography

References

External links

1942 births
Living people
German male film actors
German male television actors
20th-century German male actors
21st-century German male actors
People from Oldenburg (city)